The Apudthama National Park (formerly Jardine River National Park) is a national park in Queensland, Australia,  northwest of Brisbane and about  northwest of Cairns, on the tip of Cape York Peninsula.

The park and reserves encompass the traditional country of several Aboriginal groups including people from the Atambaya, Angkamuthi, Yadhaykenu, Gudang and Wuthathi language and social groups. The area is a living cultural landscape, with places and features named in Aboriginal languages, story-places and story-beings, and occupation and ceremony sites throughout. Today the traditional owners retain a strong and continuing interest, through their traditional rights to, and responsibilities for, the land, in the protection and management of the area.

In 2022, land formerly encompassing Jardine River National Park, Heathlands Resources Reserve and Jardine Resources Reserve were re-described as Apudthama National Park and transferred to Traditional Owners.

Coastal features
Coastal features include:
 The southern half of Orford Bay
 Orford Ness
 False Orford Ness
 Hunter Point

Vegetation

The Apudthama National Park features a complex array of vegetation types, many of which, with the exception of minor occurrences in limited zones close to the south, do not exist elsewhere.  The forest types which occur in the National Park can be broken down into nine broad categories:

Closed forests
 Simple notophyll vine forest - Simple notophyll vine forest with Neofabricia myrtifolia and Melaleuca species
 Araucarian vine forest
 Mesophyll palm forest.

Closed scrub

Asteromyrtus lysicephala scrub - Ericaceae (Epacridaceae) scrub.

Closed heath

Grevillea pteridifolia heathland.

Closed sedgeland

Gahnia sieberiana sedgeland.

Open forest

 Eucalyptus nesophila forest
 Eucalyptus nesophila / Eucalyptus tetrodonta forest
 Eucalyptus tetrodonta forest.

Low open forest

Asteromyrtus symphyocarpa / Neofabricia myrtifolia forest.

Open heath

Nepenthes mirabilis / Asteromyrtus lysicephala heath.

Tall shrubland

 Melaleuca viridiflora shrubland
 Grevillea glauca shrubland with Eucalyptus species.

Low open shrubland

Baeckea frutescens / Asteromyrtus lysicephala shrubland.

Waterfalls 
The park contains several waterfalls and rock pools, including Twin Falls, where the waters of Elliot River and Canal Creek meet, Fruit Bat Falls, Savo Falls and Elliot (Indian Head) Falls.

Gallery

See also

 Protected areas of Queensland

References

External links 
 Trek Earth Image of Fruit Bat Falls
 Trek Lens Image of Fruit Bat Falls

National parks of Far North Queensland
Protected areas established in 1994
1994 establishments in Australia